Yeom Hye-ran (born October 30, 1976) is a South Korean actress, with a portfolio of film, television and theatre performances. Yeom began her career in theater in 1999 and made her screen debut in 2003. She has since played supporting roles in film and television, notably Dear My Friends, Guardian: The Lonely and Great God (2016), I Can Speak, The Most Beautiful Goodbye (2017), Life (2018), When the Camellia Blooms, Innocent Witness (2019), Chocolate (2019-2020) and The Uncanny Counter (2020-2021).

Early years 
Yeom was born on October 30, 1976 in Yeosu, Jeollanamdo, South Korea. She was from farmer family and her mother also a market rice seller.

Yeom's original career aspiration was to be a Korean language teacher. Hence She attended Department of Korean Literature of Seoul Women's University, where she discovered her love of acting as member of college theater club.

Career

Debut and early careers 
By chance, Yeom saw flyers of member recruitment from Yeonwoo Theater Company (Yeonwoo Mudae). In 1999, She auditioned and accepted as member. In the following year, Yeom debut as an actress with play "Choi Teacher" .

Yeom made her screen debut in Bong Joon-ho's film Memories of Murder, which was released in 2003. When Yeom acted in Yeonwoo's play "This Lee" , Director Bong saw her performance and invited her to audition. She was cast as So-hyeon's mother.

In 2003, Yeom took part in play produced by the theater company Iwa-sam (playwright and director Jang Woo-Jae), The Charyeoksa and the Accordion, which depicts story of an accordionist who wanders around the country looking for his runaway wife, his honest friend Cha Charyeoksa, a third rate theater actor Yang Yang-sook, and a naive virgin girl Sunny. Yeom's performance as Sunny was praise as chilling.

The play was selected as 2003 Culture and Arts Promotion Agency New Artist Support and had encore performance in 2004 thanks to the audience's response. Yeom reprise her role Sunny in encore performance.<ref>{{Cite web |title=[공연리뷰]연극 차력사와 아코디언 |trans-title=[Performance Review] Theatre Character and Accordion' |url=https://n.news.naver.com/mnews/article/022/0000013501 |access-date=2023-02-03 |website=n.news.naver.com |language=ko}}</ref> In December 2004, Yeom won Popular Actress Award from 1st Beautiful Play Award voted by theater netizen for her performance as Sunny.

 Theater Iru and award winning theater works 
In 2004, former Yeonwoo member, Son Ki-ho establised Theater Company Iru (극단 이루) based in Seondol Theater. Yeom and fellow actress Woo Mi-hwa followed him to be founding members. Iru first founding performance was play "Ask the Blind Father for Directions" . Written and directed by Son Ki-ho, It was opened on June 4 at Dongsung Stage Small Theater in Daehangno, Seoul, and ran until July 4, 2004. The story centered in family of three consist of a son, So Seon-ho who was diagnosed by cancer with parent with dissability. Yeom acted as Seon-ho's mother, opposite Kim Hak-sun who acted as father. Yeom was praised for her performances and even called as the second Hwang Jung-min. Her costar also praised her performance and said,

The play "Ask the Blind Father for Directions"  won award at The 16th Geochang International Theatre Festival  and received support from the Seoul Foundation for Arts and Culture. From March to July 2005, Yeom reprised her role in play "Ask the Blind Father for Directions" at National Theater, Seoul Arts Theater and others. In February 2006, Yeom won the Rookie Award at the 42nd Dong-A Theater Award for her role in thr play.

In 2008, Yeom acted as Park Mi-cheon in Son Ki-ho's play "The person who lived in Gampo, Deokyi, and Yeolsu" (감포사는 분이, 덕이, 열수). She reprised the role in 2009. In 2009, at the 14th Hee-seo Theater Award, Yeom won Expected Theater Actress Award.

In May 2010, Iru's play "The person who lived in Gampo, Deokyi, and Yeolsu" performed at the 2010 Seoul Theater Festival. Yeom won Acting Award and the play won Popularity Award.

 Venture into small screen and other recent projects 
Yeom debuted in television with Noh Hee-kyung's drama Dear My Friends in 2016. Yeom acted as Soon-yeong, adopted eldest daughter of Moon Jung-ah (played by Na Moon-hee), who struggled with domestic violence. Yeom was praised for her daughter-mother lasting impression performance with Na Moon-hee.

She was cast in the drama by chance. Writer Noh Hee-kyung came to watch Na Moon-hee's play Goodnight Mom, where Yeom played as her daughter, Jessi. After watching her performance in the play, writer Noh offered her role in her upcoming drama, trough Na.“Teacher Na Moon-hee and the writer are very close, so they came to see the performance. Dear My Friends was in the planning stage, and she said that it would be nice to appear. Thanks to practicing and performing together, it was a great help to the drama. If I had met her for the first time during the drama filming, I would have frozen in front of her since he was a senior I respect so much."In the same year, Yeom acted as a vilain in her next drama Guardian: The Lonely and Great God. She took on the role Ji Yeon-sook, Ji Eun-tak's maternal aunt who bullied her niece Eun-tak (played by Kim Go-eun) for her sister's death insurance. Ji was a villain, but somehow Yeom lively acting, which makes people laugh, was a feat to watch.

In 2017, Yeom reunited for the second time with Noh Hee-kyung and director  with four episode dramas The Most Beautiful Goodbye. It was a remake of the drama of the same name by Noh that aired in 1996 on MBC. Yeom played Shin Yang-soon, Kim Geun-deok's wife, acted opposite Yoo Jae-myung, who played Kim Geun-deok, In Hee's brother. In 2018, Yeom worked for the third time with Noh Hee-kyung's drama Live as Yeom Sang-soo's mother (role played by Lee Kwang-soo). Yeom also reunited for the third time with director  in drama Life as Kang Kyung-ah, manager of Sangkook University Hospital.

In the same year, Yeom also had reunion project with Na Moon-hee in feature film I Can Speak. She played market shop owner Jin Ju-daek, who has close relationship with main character, Na Ok-bun (Na Moon-hee). Yeom was cast in I Can Speak after the casting director watched the audition video for Secret Sunshine from a decade ago.

In 2019, Yeom starred as supporting role in drama When the Camellia Blooms. Yeom acted as Hong Ja-young, a sophisticated divorce lawyer and wife to Gyu-tae (played by Oh Jung-se). Hong Ja-young is a confident and charismatic woman, who also had trust issues with her husband. Her acting in the drama garnered favorable reviews from viewers who see her character as girl crush, affectionately called the nation older sister. Her chemistry with Oh, made them won Best Couple at KBS Drama Awards, in which she won Best Supporting Actress Award. Yeom also received nomination for Best Supporting Actress in 7th APAN Star Awards and 56th Baeksang Arts Awards.

In 2021, Yeom starred in OCN drama The Uncanny Counter'' with Jo Byung-gyu, Yoo Jun-sang, and Kim Se-jeong. Yeom acted as Choo Mae-ok, a former photographer, who had powerful healing abilities. She joins the Counters after being possessed by her Son Su-ho's spirit. Yeom received Best Supporting Actress Award at 57th Baeksang Arts Awards for this role.

After over two decades of debut, Yeom had her first title role in Bae Jong-dae's mistery film Blacklight, which was released in February 2021. Produced by One Take Film, New Life, it depicts two women who their fate entangled through their husbands' car accidents. Yeom acted as Yeong-nam, a single mom, who had to care for daughter and her comatose husband. Yeom garnered critical acclaim for her role and nominated in 8th Wildflower Film Awards and 30th Buil Film Awards. She won the Best Actress Award at the 21st Jeonju International Film Festival.

Personal life 
In 2005 Yeom married her non-celebrity husband. They have a daughter together. She gave birth in 2012 and took a break from acting for awhile.

Filmography

Film

Television series

Web series

Theater

Awards and nominations

Notes

References

External links
 
 

1976 births
Living people
People from Yeosu
South Korean television actresses
South Korean film actresses
South Korean stage actresses
20th-century South Korean actresses
21st-century South Korean actresses